Belianske Tatras is a mountain range in the Eastern Tatras in North Central Slovakia. The Eastern Tatras are part of the Tatra Mountains, which are part of the Inner Western Carpathians.

Like most of the area, the peak is not accessible for tourists to protect the rare animals and plants. The first inhabitants were shepherds in the 14th century.

The main 14 km long ridge contains mountains built of limestone and dolomite with distinctive karst topography. One of just a few caves in the Tatras open to public – Belianska Cave – is located here.

Ecology and biology
The whole area is a national nature reserve covering 54.08 km² (20.9 mi²), which is part of Tatra National Park. Many endemic, rare and endangered species live or grow here.

The northern parts of the Belianske Tatras are home to the largest population of the Tatra chamois, which is endemic to the Tatras. The typical flower of the mountains is Edelweiss.

External links and references

 Slovak Caves Administration — Belianske Tatras and Belianska Cave
 BelianskeTatry.sk: Photos 

Eastern Tatras
Mountain ranges of Slovakia
Mountain ranges of the Western Carpathians
Geography of Prešov Region
Tatra Mountains
Spiš